Josh Pierson (born February 14, 2006) is an American racing driver.  He currently competes in Indy NXT for HMD Motorsports, the FIA World Endurance Championship for United Autosport, and in the IMSA WeatherTech SportsCar Championship for TDS Racing. He previously competed in the U.S. F2000 National Championship with Pabst Racing.

Career

FIA World Endurance Championship 
On August 17, 2021, United Autosports announced that it had signed Pierson to compete in the 2022 FIA World Endurance Championship. This will make Pierson the youngest ever driver to compete in the 24 Hours of Le Mans.

In 2022, Pierson made his debut in the series and managed to win the 1000 Miles of Sebring, making him the youngest ever FIA World Endurance Championship race winner.

Pierson resigned with United Autosports to compete in the 2023 FIA World Endurance Championship.

IMSA SportsCar Championship 
Pierson signed with PR1/Mathiasen Motorsports to compete in the 2022 IMSA SportsCar Championship.

On November 29, 2022, it was announced that Pierson would sign with newcomer TDS Racing for the 2023 IMSA SportsCar Championship to drive their LMP2 car.

Indy NXT 
Pierson will return to the Road to Indy ladder to race in the 2023 Indy NXT with HMD Motorsports.

IndyCar Series 
Pierson joined Ed Carpenter Racing's new racing programme for 2023, becoming a development driver for the 2023 IndyCar Series.

Racing record

Career summary 

* Season still in progress.

† As Pierson was a guest driver, he was ineligible to score points.

American open-wheel racing results

F1600 Championship Series 
(key) (Races in bold indicate pole position) (Races in italics indicate fastest lap)

U.S. F2000 National Championship 
(key) (Races in bold indicate pole position) (Races in italics indicate fastest lap)

Indy NXT
(key) (Races in bold indicate pole position) (Races in italics indicate fastest lap) (Races with L indicate a race lap led) (Races with * indicate most race laps led)

Complete WeatherTech SportsCar Championship results
(key) (Races in bold indicate pole position; results in italics indicate fastest lap)

Complete FIA World Endurance Championship results 
(key) (Races in bold indicate pole position) (Races in italics indicate fastest lap)

*Season still in progress.

Complete 24 Hours of Le Mans results

Notes

References

External links 
 

2006 births
Living people
Racing drivers from Oregon
Racing drivers from Portland, Oregon
U.S. F2000 National Championship drivers
WeatherTech SportsCar Championship drivers
FIA World Endurance Championship drivers
24 Hours of Le Mans drivers

United Autosports drivers

Indy Lights drivers
Ed Carpenter Racing drivers
HMD Motorsports drivers
TDS Racing drivers